Qingcheng County is a county in the east of Gansu province, China. It is under the administration of the prefecture-level city of Qingyang.

History 
The history of Qingcheng dates back to prehistoric settlements 200,000 years ago. And written records mention the city 4,000 years ago. During the Xia dynasty (2070 and 1600 BC), the area was part of the Yongzhou state. During the late Shang dynasty era, it became part of Yiqu state. In 266 BC it was conquered by the Qin dynasty. In 221 BC, the Qin set up the county seat of Beidi (北地郡) in present-day Maling town, ruling over what was then named Yiqu County, where the present day county seat is located. In 220 AD, Qiang and Rong barbarians captured the county. During the Three Kingdoms the Xubu occupied Qingcheng. In 265 it became part of the Western Jin Dynasty.

Administrative divisions
Qingcheng County is divided to 9 towns and 6 townships.
Towns

Townships

Climate

See also
 List of administrative divisions of Gansu

References

 

Qingcheng County
Qingyang